Anders Pedersen may refer to:

 Anders Pedersen (sailor), Norwegian competitive sailor
 Anders Gravers Pedersen, Danish anti-Islam activist
 Anders Petersen (boxer) (1899–1966), Danish flyweight boxer

See also
 Anders Petersen (disambiguation)